The following is a list of indoor arenas in Denmark. Capacity figures are based on the venue's capacity for sports events.

See also 
List of indoor arenas in Europe
List of indoor arenas by capacity

 
Denmark
Indoor arenas